The Green Line is a  light rail line in the San Diego Trolley system, operated by San Diego Trolley, Inc. an operating division of the San Diego Metropolitan Transit System (MTS).  The route serves Downtown San Diego, Mission Valley, and the cities of La Mesa, El Cajon, and Santee. The Green Line has the second highest ridership of the San Diego Trolley's three regular lines, transporting 13,673,926 riders during FY 2014 according to the MTS.

The line is one of four lines in the Trolley system, the others being the Blue, Orange, and Silver lines.

History

The Green Line is the third line in the San Diego Trolley system with service beginning on July 10, 2005, upon the completion and opening of the  Mission Valley East extension.

The line operates on this extension as well as segments previously served by the Blue Line between the Old Town Transit Center and Mission San Diego, and by the Orange Line east of the Grossmont Transit Center. It traverses Mission Valley, San Diego, which is the valley of the San Diego River, and runs parallel to Interstate 8 for this segment.

The San Diego State University (SDSU) stop on the Green Line is the San Diego Trolley system's only underground station.

2012 realignment
During a system redesign which took effect on September 2, 2012, as part of the Trolley Renewal Project, the western portion of the Green Line was extended from Old Town south through downtown and the Bayside, terminating at 12th & Imperial Transit Center's Bayside Terminal.  This redesign allowed for two "universal" transfer points among all three lines, at the 12th & Imperial Transit Center, and at the adjacent Santa Fe Depot/America Plaza stations.

Stations

References

 
San Diego Trolley lines
Santee, California
Railway lines opened in 2005